Habeat is a 2009 album by Sherine.

Track listing 

2009 albums